Kraken III is the name of the third studio album Colombian group Kraken It was released on January 3, 1990 by Sonolux. The first single from the album was "Rostros Ocultos". The second single was "Lágrimas de Fuego".

Information 
This album confirmed the progressive trend of the band. A trend that featured a group identity and a concept of what is Kraken. This album started to show the other bands of the country's ideology which is the National Rock and how it can be strengthened.

Track listing

References 

Kraken (band) albums
1993 albums